Byers-Muma House is a historic home located in East Donegal Township, Lancaster County, Pennsylvania. It is a -story, stone dwelling with Pennsylvania German Colonial and Georgian style design influences. The original section was built about 1740, with additions about 1805, 1840–1850, and 1998. Also on the property is a mid-18th century well.

It was listed on the National Register of Historic Places in 2002.

References 

Houses on the National Register of Historic Places in Pennsylvania
Houses completed in 1740
Houses in Lancaster County, Pennsylvania
National Register of Historic Places in Lancaster County, Pennsylvania
1740 establishments in Pennsylvania